

References

See also
Dutch monarchs family tree

Orange-Nassau
Dutch monarchy